Pteronarcys is a genus of giant stoneflies in the family Pteronarcyidae. There are about 8 described species in Pteronarcys.

Species
 Pteronarcys biloba Newman, 1838 (knobbed salmonfly)
 Pteronarcys californica Newport, 1848 (giant salmonfly)
 Pteronarcys comstocki Smith, 1917
 Pteronarcys dorsata (Say, 1823) (American salmonfly)
 Pteronarcys pictetii Hagen, 1873 (midwestern salmonfly)
 Pteronarcys princeps Banks, 1907 (ebony salmonfly)
 Pteronarcys proteus Newman, 1838 (Appalachian salmonfly)
 Pteronarcys scotti Ricker, 1952

References

 DeWalt R, Cao Y, Tweddale T, Grubbs S, Hinz L, Pessino M, Robinson J (2012). "Ohio USA stoneflies (Insecta, Plecoptera): species richness estimation, distribution of functional niche traits, drainage affiliations, and relationships to other states". ZooKeys 178: 1-26.

Further reading

 Arnett, Ross H. (2000). American Insects: A Handbook of the Insects of America North of Mexico. CRC Press.

Plecoptera
Plecoptera genera